Koncordie Amalie Dietrich (née Nelle) (26 May 1821 – 9 March 1891) was a German naturalist who was best known for her work in Australia from 1863 to 1872, collecting specimens for the Museum Godeffroy in Hamburg.

Australia
Dietrich was one of a number of influential German-speaking residents  such as William Blandowski, Ludwig Becker, Hermann Beckler, Diedrich Henne, Gerard Krefft, Johann Luehmann, Johann Menge, Ludwig Preiss, Carl Ludwig Christian Rümker (a.k.a. Ruemker), Moritz Richard Schomburgk, Richard Wolfgang Semon, George Ulrich, Eugene von Guérard, Robert von Lendenfeld, Ferdinand von Mueller, Georg von Neumayer, and Carl Wilhelmi  who brought their "epistemic traditions" to Australia, and not only became "deeply entangled with the Australian colonial project", but also "intricately involved in imagining, knowing and shaping colonial Australia" (Barrett, et al., 2018, p.2).

Controversy
Whilst in Queensland, Australia, Dietrich "actively sought fresh Aboriginal skeletons for her European clients”. While this is most likely part of a local legend that presents Dietrich as the 'Angel of Black Death, it is accepted that she did send the human remains of several Indigenous Australians to Hamburg. Her contribution to colonialism – pertaining to both the anthropological as well as the botanical aspect – are the subject of recent academic debates.

Career
Amalie Dietrich was born in Siebenlehn, Saxony, German Confederation. In 1846, she married Wilhelm August Salomo Dietrich, a doctor. With no formal training she learnt all she could from him about collecting and they planned careers working as naturalists. Between 1845 and 1862 they made a precarious living collecting Alpine specimens to sell to chemists for medicines and to museums for their natural history collections. Some of the delicate alpine flowers she collected in this period can be seen on display in the Natural History Museum in Freiburg.

Dietrich spent the years from 1863 - 1872 in Queensland, Australia where she collected a wide range of species as well as artefacts created by Indigenous Australians. She is thought to be the first European to find and collect a Taipan snake while she was there.

Species

She collected the type specimens of many species, and in a number of cases the author of the description honoured her in the species epithet (dietrichiae, dietrichiana, amaliae, etc.). Species whose type specimens she collected include:

Aongstroemia dietrichiae Müll.Hal. (1868) - Dicranella dietrichiae (Müll.Hal.) A.JaegerLaxmannia illicebrosa Rchb.f. (1871) -  a synonym of Laxmannia gracilis R.Br.Marsdenia hemiptera Rchb. (1871)Fissidens dietrichiae Müll.Hal. (1872)Macromitrium sordidevirens Müll.Hal. (1872) - Macromitrium aurescens HampeSargassum aciculare Grunow (1874) - Sargassum filifolium var. aciculare (Grunow) GrunowSargassum amaliae Grunow (1874) - accepted Sargassum godeffroyi Grunow (1874) - accepted Schoenus elatus Boeck. (1875) - Schoenus falcatus R.Br. Scirpus dietrichiae Boeck. (1875) - Lipocarpha microcephala (R.Br.) Kunth Scleria dietrichiae Boeck. (1875) - Scleria levis Retz. Scleria novae-hollandiae Boeck. (1875) - Scleria laxa R.Br. Carex dietrichiae Boeck. (1875) - Carex indica L. 
Cyperus luerssenii Boeck. (1875) - Cyperus subulatus R.Br. 
Acacia dietrichiana F.Muell. (1882)  
Barbula subcalycina Mull.Hal. (1882) - (not listed in IPNI, APNI, nor Plants of the world online; listed in AusMoss) 
Frullania dietrichana Steph. (1910) - Frullania seriata Gottsche ex Steph. 
Indigofera amaliae Domin (1915) - Indigofera polygaloides M.B.Scott 
Acacia penninervis var. longiracemosa Domin (1926) 
Cryptocarya multicostata Domin (1926) - Cryptocarya hypospodia F.Muell. 
Cryptocarya triplinervis var. euryphylla Domin (1926) - Cryptocarya triplinervis R.Br. 
Psoralea dietrichiae Domin (1926) - Cullen australasicum (Schltdl.) J.W.Grimes 
Swainsona luteola var. dietrichiae Domin (1926) - Swainsona luteola F.Muell. 
Tetrastigma nitens var. amaliae Domin (1927) - Tetrastigma nitens (F.Muell.) Planch. 
Plectronia coprosmoides var. spathulata O.Swartz (1927) - Cyclophyllum coprosmoides var. spathulatum (O.Schwarz) S.T.Reynolds & R.J.F.Hend. 
Premna benthamiana Domin (1928) - Premna serratifolia L. 
Hibiscus amaliae Domin (1930) - Hibiscus heterophyllus Vent. (1805) 
Mallotus claoxyloides f. grossedentata Domin (1930) - Mallotus ficifolius (Baill.) Pax & K.Hoffm. Mallotus claoxyloides var. glabratus Domin (1930) - Mallotus claoxyloides (F.Muell.) Müll.Arg. Pagetia dietrichiae Domin (1930) - Bosistoa medicinalis (F.Muell.) T.G.HartleyPersoonia amaliae Domin (1930)Cyperus pumilus var. nervulosus Kuk. (1936) - Cyperus nervulosus (Kük.) S.T.BlakeHelichrysum eriocephalum J.H.Willis (1952)Nortonia amaliae (a wasp)Drosera dietrichiana Rchb.f. (1871) - a synonym of Drosera burmanni Vahl (1794)

Current names, synonymy etc based on searches of the Australian Plant Name Index and Plants of the World online. Where no alternative name is given above, the species name is that accepted by either or both of these sources with the exception of the seaweeds.)

Collections
Her collections formed the basis of Zur Flora von Queensland ("On Queensland's Flora", 1875) by Christian Luerssen.  While in Australia, she visited Ferdinand von Mueller, and in 1881 Mueller acquired a set of her specimens from Luerssen. (The National Herbarium of Victoria (MEL) holds 2790 of her specimens.) She published nothing in her name. However, her collections continue to be an important resource in herbaria  around the world (MEL, B, BM, BRSL, HBG, JE, K, L , MO, P, US, W).

Dietrich Place
Dietrich Place in the Canberra suburb of Chisholm is named in recognition of her work in Australia.

See also
Timeline of women in science

Notes

References
 Barrett, L., Eckstein, L., Hurley, A.W. & Schwarz A. (2018), "Remembering German-Australian Colonial Entanglement: An Introduction", Postcolonial Studies, Vol.21, No.1, (January 2018), pp.1-5. 

External links

 Stefanie Affeldt, Wulf D. Hund: From ‘Plant Hunter’ to ‘Tomb Raider’. The Changing Image of Amalie Dietrich. In: Australian Studies Journal | Zeitschrift für Australienstudien, 33-34, 2019-2020, pp. 89–124, open-access 
Australian Science Archives Project. 1998. Amalie Dietrich 1821- 1891 The Letters of Amalie Dietrich''

Queensland Photographs at Pitt-Rivers Museum
 The Hard Road, Charitas Bischoff, Martin Hopkinson Ltd, London, 1931
Dietrich, Lodewyckx, & Lodewyckx, A. (1943). Australische Briefe / von Amalie Dietrich ; with a biographical sketch, exercises and a vocabulary, edited by Augustin Lodewyckx. Melbourne: Melbourne University Press in association with Oxford University Press.
Bischoff, C. (1914). " Amalie Dietrich, ein Leben von Charitas Bischoff. (Grote'sche Sammlung von Werken zeitgenössischer Schriftsteller; Bd. 97). Berlin: Grote.
Lüttge, U., & Institut für Auslandsbeziehungen. (1988). " Amalie Dietrich (1821-1891) German biologist in Australia, homage to Australia's Bicentenary, 1988 / edited by Ulrich Lüttge. (Studies in international cultural relations ; v. 29). Stuttgart: Institut für Auslandsbeziehungen.
Sumner, R. (1993). A woman in the wilderness, The story of Amalie Dietrich in Australia, Ray Sumner. Kensington, NSW, Australia: New South Wales University Press.

German naturalists
German entomologists
1821 births
1891 deaths
German women scientists
Women botanists
Women entomologists
Women naturalists
Botanists active in Australia
19th-century German botanists
19th-century German zoologists
19th-century women scientists
19th-century Australian women